Niquette Bay State Park is a  state park in Colchester, Vermont, on the shore of Lake Champlain.

Activities includes swimming, fishing, hiking, wildlife watching, and winter sports.

There is a swimming beach and hiking trails through the forested area and down to the beach.

References

External links
 Niquette Bay State Park - A Hidden Gem - Lake Champlain Land Trust

State parks of Vermont
Colchester, Vermont
Protected areas of Chittenden County, Vermont